Mellangoose is a hamlet in the parish of Mawgan-in-Meneage, Cornwall, England.

References

Hamlets in Cornwall